The women's heptathlon event at the 2017 Summer Universiade was held on 26 and 27 August at the Taipei Municipal Stadium.

Medalists

Results

100 metres hurdles
Wind:Heat 1: 0.0 m/s, Heat 2: -1.4 m/s, Heat 3: -1.4 m/s

High jump

Shot put

200 metres
Wind:Heat 1: -2.2 m/s, Heat 2: -0.2 m/s, Heat 3: -3.4 m/s

Long jump

Javelin throw

800 metres

Final standings

References

Heptathlon
2017 in women's athletics
2017